The following is a list of notable events and releases of the year 2015 in Danish music.

Events

January

February
 1 - The Danish National Chamber Orchestra, under its new name of Danmarks Underholdningsorkester, gives its first concert as a privately funded ensemble, at the Royal Academy of Music in Copenhagen.
 7 - The Dansk Melodi Grand Prix Final was executed on February 7, in Aalborg.

March

April

May

June
 3 – The 17th Distortion festival started in Copenhagen (June 3–7).
 27 – The Roskilde Festival opened, with a line-up including Muse, Florence and the Machine and Pharrell Williams.

July
 16 – G! Festival opened in Göta, Eysturoy, Faroe Islands (July 16–18).

August

September

October

November

December

Album and Singles releases

January

February

March

April

May

June

July

August

September

October

November

December

Deaths
March
 21 – Jørgen Ingmann, Danish jazz and pop guitarist (born 1925).

 August
 30 – Hugo Rasmussen, Danish bassist (born 1941).

See also
Music of Denmark
Denmark in the Eurovision Song Contest 2015

References

 
Danish music
Danish
Muse